Lake Manguao is a lake located in the northernmost region of the island of Palawan in the Philippines. It harbors several endemic species of fish, such as the sleeper goby Oxyeleotris expatria.

Bibliography

References

Manguao
Landforms of Palawan